Gerald Arpino (January 14, 1923 – October 29, 2008) was an American dancer and choreographer. He was co-founder of the Joffrey Ballet and succeeded Robert Joffrey as its artistic director in 1988.

Life and career
Born on Staten Island, New York, Gerald Arpino studied ballet with Mary Ann Wells, while stationed with the Coast Guard in Seattle, Washington. Arpino first met Robert Joffrey at Wells's school. He studied modern dance with May O'Donnell in whose company he appeared in the 1950s.

In 1956, Arpino was a founding member of the Robert Joffrey Theatre Ballet with Robert Joffrey. He served as co-director of the company's school, the American Ballet Center, and was the leading dancer until an injury forced him to stop in 1963. By 1965 he had choreographed five works for the company, and became the Joffrey's co-director and resident choreographer. In the first twenty-five years of the company's existence, Arpino had created more than a third of all its commissioned ballets.

After the death of Robert Joffrey in 1988, Arpino became the Artistic Director of the Joffrey Ballet and in 1995 moved the company to Chicago. In July 2007, he was named "Artistic Director Emeritus" as a search for a successor began. Arpino suffered from prostate cancer for seven months and eventually died on October 29, 2008.

Malcolm McDowell plays a character loosely based on Arpino in the Robert Altman film The Company, which had the participation of the Joffrey Ballet.

In 2014 Arpino was inducted into the Chicago Gay and Lesbian Hall of Fame.

Choreography for The Joffrey Ballet

Partita for 4 (1961) Music by Vittorio Reiti
Ropes (1961) Music by Charles Ives
Sea Shadow (1961) Music by Maurice Ravel, second movement of Piano Concerto in G. Alternate music by Michael Colgrass, 1963 (due to copyright problems with Ravel). 
Incubus (1962) Music by Anton Webern
The Palace (1963) Music by Rebekah Harkness
Viva Vivaldi! (1965) Music by Antonio Vivaldi
Olympics (1966) Music by Toshiro Mayuzumi
Nightwings (1966) Music by John LaMontaine
Arcs and Angels (1967) Music by William Laws
Cello Concerto (1967) Music by Antonio Vivaldi
Elegy (1967) Music by Andrzej Panufnik
Secret Places (1968) Music by Wolfgang Amadeus Mozart
The Clowns (1968) Music by Hershy Kay
A Light Fantastic (1968) Music by B. Britten
Fanfarita (1968) Music by Ruperto Chapi y Lorente
Animus (1969) Music by Jacob Druckman
The Poppet (1969) Music by Hans Werner Henze
Confetti (1970) Music by Gioachino Rossini
Solarwind (1970) Music by Jacob Druckman
Trinity (1970) Music by Alan Raph and Lee Holdridge
Reflections (1971) Music by Pyotr Ilyich Tchaikovsky
Valentine (1971) Music by Jacob Druckman
Kettentanz (1971) Music by Johann Strauss and Johann Simon Mayr
Chabriesque (1972) Music by Emmanuel Chabrier
Sacred Grove on Mount Tamalpais (1972) Music by Alan Raph
Jackpot (1972) Music by Jacob Druckman
The Relativity of Icarus (1974) Music by Gerhard Samuel
Drums, Dreams and Banjos (1975) Music by Stephen Foster
Orpheus Times Light (1976) Music by José Serebrier
Touch Me (1977) Music by Rev. James Cleveland
L'Air D'Esprit (1978) Music by Adolphe Adam
Suite Saint-Saëns (1978) Music by Camille Saint-Saëns
Choura (1978) Music by Riccardo Drigo
Epode (1979) Music by Dmitri Shostakovich
Celebration (1980) Music by Dmitri Shostakovich
Diverdissemente (1980) Music by Giuseppe Verdi
Light Rain (1981) Music by Douglas Adams and Russ Gauthier
Round of Angels (1983) Music by Gustav Mahler
Quarter Tones for Mr. B. (1983) Music by Teo Macero
Italian Suite (1983) Music by Ermanno Wolf-Ferrari
Jamboree (1984) Music by Teo Macero
Birthday Variations (1986) Music by Giuseppe Verdi
Anniversary Pas de Deux (1986) Music by Victor Herbert
Waltz of the Flowers (The Nutcracker) (1987) Music by Pyotr Ilyich Tchaikovsky
The Land of Snow (The Nutcracker) (1987) Music by Pyotr Ilyich Tchaikovsky
The Pantages and the Palace Present "Two-A-Day" (1989) Music by Rebekah Harkness and E. Kaplan
I/DNA (2003) Music by Charles Ives
Ruth: Ricordi Per Due (2004) Music by Tomaso Albinoni

References
Chujoy, Anatole. The Dance Encyclopedia. (Simon and Schuster, 1967) 
Doeser, Linda. Ballet and Dance: The World's Major Companies, 1977. 
Whitney, Mary. Joffrey Ballet XXV: Celebrating 25 Years of the Joffrey Ballet from A to Z (Steelograph Co. Inc., 1981). 64 pages.

Notes

External links
 The Gerald Arpino and Robert Joffrey Foundation 
Joffrey Ballet Website 
Associated Press obituary in the NY Times, October 29, 2008

American male ballet dancers
American choreographers
Ballet choreographers
People from Staten Island
1923 births
2008 deaths
Musicians from New York City
20th-century American ballet dancers